Cyril Hennion (born 3 January 1992) is a French footballer who plays as a midfielder for Villefranche SJB.

References 

1992 births
Living people
French footballers
Association football midfielders
Ligue 1 players
OGC Nice players